The Marble Throne is a 250-year-old royal throne in Golestan Palace, Tehran, Iran.

The throne was built from 1747 to 1751. It was designed by Mirza Baba Shirazi (Naqqash Bashi) and royal stonecutter, Mohammad Ebrahim Esfahani. It consists of 65 marble stone pieces from a mine in Yazd. The throne's supports are carved in the shape of men, women, fairies, and demons.

The Royal Balcony of the Marble Throne is said to be built during the reign of Karim Khan Zand, but Karim khan is known to have even refused the title king, and preferred to sit on a carpet rather than a throne so his ownership of the Marble throne is unlikely. It was changed several times during the Qajar period. The twin stone columns of the balcony were transferred to Tehran, by the order of Agha Mohammad Khan, from Shiraz.

The Sun Throne was probably modelled after it.

External links 

Individual thrones
Iranian culture
Architecture in Iran